Europium fluoride may refer to:

 Europium(II) fluoride (europium difluoride), EuF2
 Europium(III) fluoride (europium trifluoride), EuF3